The Las Vegas Review-Journal is a daily subscription newspaper published in Las Vegas, Nevada, since 1909. It is the largest circulating daily newspaper in Nevada and one of two daily newspapers in the Las Vegas area.

The Review-Journal has a joint operating agreement with The Greenspun Corporation-owned Las Vegas Sun, which runs through 2040. In 2005, the Sun ceased afternoon publication and began distribution as a section of the Review-Journal. On March 18, 2015, the sale of the newspaper's parent company, Stephens Media LLC, to New Media Investment Group was completed. In December 2015, casino magnate Sheldon Adelson purchased the newspaper for $140 million via News + Media Capital Group LLC. GateHouse Media, a subsidiary of New Media Investment Group, was retained to manage the newspaper. $140 million was considered a steep price amounting to a 69% gain for New Media Investment Group after owning the newspaper for nine months.

History
The Clark County Review was first printed in 1909 and became the Las Vegas Review in 1926 when owner Frank Garside, who owned several other Nevada papers, brought in Al Cahlan as a partner. In March 1929, the Clark County Journal began publication, and in July of that year, the Review bought the Journal and shortly thereafter began co-publication as the Las Vegas Evening Review-Journal. In the early 1940s, Cahlan and Garside's company, Southwestern Publishing, bought the Las Vegas Age, from Charles P. "Pop" Squires, which began publication in 1905 and was the oldest surviving paper in Las Vegas. The word "evening" was dropped from the name in 1949 when Garside left the company and Cahlan struck an agreement with Donald W. Reynolds and his Donrey Media Group.

In 1953, the RJ signed on KORK, one of Las Vegas' earliest radio stations.  Two years later, it signed on Las Vegas' third television station, KLRJ-TV, in 1955, later changing the calls to KORK-TV.  The station was sold in 1979, changing its call letters again first to KVBC, and then, in 2010, to the current KSNV-DT.

In December 1960, Reynolds exercised a buyout option with Cahlan, and bought the paper.

Reynolds died in 1993, and longtime friend Jack Stephens bought his company, renamed it Stephens Media and moved the company's headquarters to Las Vegas. The Review-Journal entered into its first Joint Operating Agreement, or JOA, with the Sun in 1990, which was amended in 2005. In early 2015, the Stephens Media newspapers were sold to New Media Investment Group.

The current Review-Journal headquarters was built in 1971. A new $40 million printing press was installed in 2000 as part of a four-year, 152,000-square-foot expansion project. The two printing presses weigh 910 tons and consist of 16 towers. They were the largest presses in the world when they were installed.

The newspaper has won the "General Excellence" award from the Nevada Press Association several times and has also won the "Freedom of the Press" award for its First Amendment battles from the statewide organization.

Sheldon Adelson estate ownership
When the paper was sold in 2015, it was initially unclear who the buyer was. The purchaser was a limited liability company, News + Media Capital Group LLC, and the only name listed on the documents was Michael Schroeder, a publisher of four small regional newspapers in Connecticut. At a December 10 staff meeting informing the Review-Journal staff that the paper had been sold, Schroeder was introduced as the manager. He refused to say who the owners of News + Media were, saying that employees should "focus on [their] jobs...and don't worry about who [the owners] are." Jason Taylor, the Review-Journal's publisher, said only that the ownership included "multiple owner/investors, that some are from Las Vegas, and that in face-to-face meetings he has been assured that the group will not meddle in the newspaper’s editorial content.” There were widespread rumors that the primary buyer was Sheldon Adelson, and a week later three Review-Journal reporters confirmed that the purchase had been orchestrated by Adelson's son-in-law Patrick Dumont on Adelson's behalf. A month before the new owner was revealed, three reporters at the newspaper received an assignment from corporate management: Spend two weeks monitoring the activity of three Clark County judges. One of the judges was District Judge Elizabeth Gonzalez, who was hearing a long-running wrongful termination lawsuit filed against Adelson and his company, a lawsuit alleging that Adelson's Macao casino, Sands Macao, was connected to the Chinese Triads.

In January a set of editorial principles were drawn up and publicized to ensure the newspaper's independence and to deal with possible conflicts of interest involving Adelson's ownership. In February Craig Moon, a veteran of the Gannett organization, was announced as the new publisher and promptly withdrew those principles from publication. He also began to personally review, edit, and sometimes kill stories about an Adelson-promoted proposal for the future Las Vegas Raiders football stadium. In the months since, reporters say that stories about Adelson, and particularly about an ongoing lawsuit involving his business dealings in Macau, have been heavily edited by top management.

The new ownership triggered numerous departures. On December 23 the paper's editor Mike Hengel stepped down in a "voluntary buyout". Many reporters and editors left the newspaper citing "curtailed editorial freedom, murky business dealings and unethical managers." Longtime columnist John L. Smith resigned after he was told he could no longer write anything about Adelson, a frequent focus of his reporting up until then. Within six months, all three of the reporters who broke the story of Adelson's ownership had left the paper.

Other publications
The Review-Journal is responsible for several other niche publications:
 El Tiempo – A free weekly Spanish language paper distributed around the Las Vegas area
 Neon – a weekend publication distributed through the Review-Journal that covers music, movies, arts, and dining.
 rjmagazine – A Sunday magazine for home delivery subscribers, established in March 2020.  The quarterly publication focuses on diverse topics including lifestyle, food, events, home trends, and people.

The Review-Journal also operates several Nevada newspapers:
 Boulder City Review – A weekly paper that debuted Oct. 29, 2009. The print edition is distributed on Thursday mornings.
 Pahrump Valley Times – A bi-weekly newspaper. The print edition is distributed on Wednesday and Friday mornings.
 Tonopah Times-Bonanza & Goldfield News – Serving communities in Nye and Esmeralda counties since 1901.

Website and video
Las Vegas Review-Journal launched its website as LVRJ.com on Jan. 15, 1997. By the end of the year, it was recognized as one of the top online papers in the U.S. by the Internet Job Source. The Review-Journal also operated LasVegas.com as a general information site. LVRJ.com was redesigned in 2000 and the site was rebranded as Reviewjournal.com two years later. In 2012, the RJ launched its first apps for iPhone, Android, and iPad. A major online redesign launched in April 2017 with an emphasis on video. The RJ built a studio on its downtown campus to produce high-end live and on-demand videos for news, politics and sports.

Programs include:
 Reporter Roundtable – Interviews and panel discussions with reporters covering major stories
 Vegas Nation – Coverage of Raiders football
 Golden Edge – Coverage of the Las Vegas Golden Knights hockey team
 Covering the Cage – UFC and MMA coverage
 Nevada Politics Today
 Sports Betting Spotlight

In addition to delivering its shows on the Review-Journal website, the Review-Journal launched a Roku app in early 2018.

Accolades
In 2018 and 2022, Editor and Publisher magazine named the Review-Journal as one of 10 newspapers in the United States on the magazine's annual list of "10 Newspapers That Do It Right".

Controversy
In 1998, the newspaper killed a story about casino mogul Steve Wynn's sexual harassment of employees. The newspaper reported about the axed story in 2018, after The Wall Street Journal published a story in which dozens of people alleged that they had been victims of sexual misconduct by Wynn.

Copyright infringement litigation

In 2010, the Review-Journal's then-owner Stephens Media launched a copyright enforcement company called Righthaven LLC, which began a series of legal suits claiming copyright infringements. The company's practice was to search the internet for uses of Review-Journal material, purchase the copyright for that material from the newspaper and then file suit for copyright infringement. According to The Wall Street Journal, "Defendants typically get no warning, no take-down request, just a suit." Between March and August 2010, Righthaven LLC filed copyright infringement suits against 107 blogs, political forums, website operators, and others.

The Electronic Frontier Foundation, together with other pro bono attorneys, filed an Answer and Counterclaim on behalf of Democratic Underground, a political website that Righthaven sued after a Democratic Underground member posted a five-sentence excerpt from a Review-Journal article; the counterclaim, filed against Stephens Media and Righthaven asserted that alleged a "sham relationship" between the newspaper and Righthaven, and accused Righthaven of copyright fraud.

In March 2011, a federal judge dismissed a suit brought by Righthaven, stating that no evidence had been presented that the forum posting of a Las Vegas Review-Journal editorial for 40 days for noncommercial use harmed the market value of the work. In June 2011, another federal judge ruled that Righthaven had no standing to sue for copyright infringement, on the grounds that the original parties retain the actual copyrights. In August 2011 another case was dismissed by Federal judge Philip Pro, who found that Righthaven had no standing to sue, and in any case the defendant's posting of a Review-Journal editorial to a blog was protected by fair use. The next month the Review-Journal terminated its arrangement with Righthaven, which was forced into receivership in November 2011 because of unpaid legal settlements.

Owners and publishers (past and present)
Owners
 Frank Garside (1909–1949)
 A. E. Cahlan (1926–1961)
 Donald W. Reynolds (1949–1993)
 Jack Stephens (1993–2015)
 New Media Investment Group (2015)
 Sheldon Adelson (2015–2021)
 News + Media Capital Group LLC (2015–present)

Publishers

 A. E. Cahlan (1926–1961)
 Fred W. Smith (1961–)
 Sherman Frederick (1992–2010)
 Bob Brown (2010–2014)
 Ed Moss (2014)
 Mark Ficarra (2014–2015)
 Jason Taylor (2015–2016)
 Craig Moon (2016–2018)
 J. Keith Moyer (2018–present)

Current and past publishers and contributors
 Norm Clarke, wrote the column "Vegas Confidential" from 1999 to 2016
 Ned Day, columnist whose car was bombed in 1986
 Denver Dickerson, former editorial director who became Speaker of the Nevada Assembly
 Major Garrett, former reporter who became CBS' Chief White House correspondent
 Jeff German, former investigative reporter found fatally stabbed outside his home
 Paul Gutierrez, former reporter who went on to report for ESPN
 John Katsilometes, celebrity and entertainment columnist
 Lorna Kesterson, former reporter and mayor of Henderson, Nevada
 David Lamb, former reporter
 Heidi Knapp Rinella, former restaurant critic
 Robin Leach, former entertainment reporter for the newspaper's niche division
 Gary Martin, former Washington bureau chief
 Michael Ramirez, cartoonist
 Donald W. Reynolds, owner from 1949 to 1993
 Wayne Allyn Root, politics opinion columnist
 Neal Rubin, former features writer
 Debra Saunders, former White House correspondent
 Joe Schoenmann, former reporter
 Ira Stoll, columnist
 Vin Suprynowicz, former columnist
 Jude Wanniski, former political columnist

See also

 List of newspapers in Nevada
 Media in Las Vegas

References

External links
 Las Vegas Review-Journal official website

1909 establishments in Nevada
Daily newspapers published in the United States
Newspapers published in Las Vegas
Publications established in 1909